WGST may refer to:

 WGST (AM), a radio station (720 AM) licensed to Hogansville, Georgia, United States
 WBIN (AM), a radio station (640 AM) licensed to Atlanta, Georgia, which held the call sign WGST from 1989 to 2020
 WBZY, a radio station (105.7 FM) licensed to Canton, Georgia, which held the call sign WGST-FM from 1993 to 2000
 WGKA, a radio station (920 AM) licensed to Atlanta, Georgia, which held the call sign WGST from 1925 to 1989